KNPC may refer to:

 KNPC (FM), a radio station (88.5 FM) licensed to Hardin, Montana, United States
 Kuwait National Petroleum Company